This Is the Law was a Canadian panel game show which aired on CBC Television from 1971 to 1976.

It presented short, humorous vignettes supposedly set in various towns and cities across Canada which ran with musical accompaniment rather than a soundtrack, and challenged panelists to guess which (obscure) law of that particular region was being broken by the "Lawbreaker" character (portrayed by Paul Soles), who always got arrested at the end of the vignette (Robert Warner starred as the police officer). The vignettes were quite subtle, and more often than not, despite many guesses, the panelists were unable to come up with the law that was actually being broken, as the laws featured were generally archaic - though, at the time of production, still on the books in the featured communities. (An example: in one vignette, the Lawbreaker is seen wearing a caveman-style costume at an event and engaging in dubious behavior before being suddenly arrested. After the panel failed to correctly identify the indiscretion, Willis indicated it was because the Lawbreaker's costume did not fully cover his chest and in the Canadian locale where the vignette was set, it was illegal for individuals of any gender to expose their nipples in public.)

The vignettes alternated with depictions of actual court cases, presented in a series of still cartoons, in storyboard format, with narration. The narrator would end by asking a question about how the judge eventually ruled. The four panelists would each guess what the judge decided, and why, and each panelist would conclude by lighting up a large "Yes" or "No" in front of his or her seat. After all four panelists had guessed, the answer would be revealed.

Paul Soles was the first show host for the initial 1971 summer episodes. Austin Willis became host from the regular 1971 fall season until the end of the series.

Cast

Panelists
Julie Amato (1976)
Bill Charlton (businessman by profession)
Susan Gay (1971–1972)
Susan Keller (1972–1975)
Madeline Kronby (June–August 1971)
Dini Petty (1971)
Hart Pomerantz (lawyer and comedian by profession)
Larry Solway (1971–1975)

Supporting vignette actors
Paul Bradley
Valri Bromfield
Eric Clavering
Trudy Desmond
Robert McHeady
Monica Parker

External links
Queen's University Directory of CBC Television Series: This is the Law, accessed 14 August 2006,  accessed 16 May 2016
 

1970s Canadian game shows
Canadian legal television series
CBC Television original programming
1971 Canadian television series debuts
1975 Canadian television series endings